Bertha is an opera in one act, with music by Ned Rorem to an English libretto by Kenneth Koch, an original work parodying Shakespeare's histories. Rorem wrote the work originally at the request of the Metropolitan Opera (Met) Studio in the 1960s, intended as an opera for children. However, the Met studio rejected the work. The work was premiered at Alice Tully Hall in New York City on November 25, 1973 with Beverly Wolff in the title role.

Bertha is still sporadically performed. It received a performance by The Golden Fleece in New York City in 1981. In the UK, the New World Opera Company produced the work in London in February 2001.

Roles
 Bertha, queen of Norway (mezzo-soprano)
 Noble
 Teacher
 Scotchman
 Man
 Barbarian Chieftain
 Counsellor
 Third Scotchman
 Officer
 Second Scotchman
 Norwegian Citizen
 Common Norwegian
 Old Man
 Second Norwegian Citizen
 Messenger
 Girl

Synopsis
The setting is the royal residence in Oslo, Norway, in the medieval era.

The garrison of the slightly deranged Queen Bertha of Oslo is encased by barbarians. She leads an attack, in a ring of white eagles, and the attackers are repelled. A teacher questions her as to whether her own subjects are barbarians, for which Bertha orders the teacher executed.

After the country is at peace, Bertha then declares war on Scotland. The Counselor objects to these endless wars, and Bertha dismisses the council. Two young lovers meet in Bertha's garden, but they are shot dead there, as the queen disapproves of lovers' trysts.

As Bertha ages, her madness increases and she keeps wanting new adventures. Bertha gives Norway to the barbarians so that she can reconquer the nation. She does this, but collapses dead on her regained throne. The people praise her as a great queen.

References

External links
 Boosey & Hawkes page on Bertha
 Karren Alenier interview with Ned Rorem, Scene4 Magazine (online magazine), June 2005
 Peter Graeme Woolf, "S&H Operas Review: Ned Rorem - Fables; Bertha; Three Sisters. New World Opera Company, Bridewell Theatre, London 23 February 2001".

English-language operas
One-act operas
Operas
1973 operas
Operas by Ned Rorem